The Blue Ice is a 1948 thriller novel by the British writer Hammond Innes and published by Collins.

References

Bibliography
 James Vinson & D. L. Kirkpatrick. Contemporary Novelists. St. James Press, 1986.

1948 British novels
Novels by Hammond Innes
British thriller novels
William Collins, Sons books